Tony Chinedu Nwulu a former member of the House of Representatives of Nigeria representing the Oshodi-Isolo II constituency. A member of the United Progressive Party (UPP), after defecting from the PDP, under whose banner he won the 2015 general election. He sponsored the passing of the Not Too Young To Run bill.

Early life
Nwulu was born in Ezinihitte Mbaise.

Political career
Nwulu was elected as a member of the House of Representatives representing the Oshodi-Isolo II constituency in 2015. In 2018, he defected from the PDP to United Progressive Party (UPP).

References

People from Lagos State
Members of the House of Representatives (Nigeria)
Living people
Peoples Democratic Party members of the House of Representatives (Nigeria)
Year of birth missing (living people)